Oleksiy Larin (born 4 June 1994) is a Ukrainian footballer who currently plays as a defender who plays for Neftchi Fergana.

Career

Dunav Ruse
Larin went on trial with Bulgarian club Dunav Ruse during January 2017 and signed a one-and-a-half years contract on 7 February. He made his debut in the Bulgarian First League on 24 February 2017 against Botev Plovdiv. He scored his first goal for the team on 2 April 2017 in a match against Slavia Sofia.

Pakhtakor Tashkent
On 10 February 2022, Larin signed for Uzbekistan Super League champions Pakhtakor Tashkent.

Career statistics

Club

Honours

Club
Istiklol
 Tajik League (3): 2019, 2020, 2021
 Tajik Cup (1): 2019
Tajik Supercup (3): 2019, 2020, 2021

Pakhtakor Tashkent
 Uzbekistan Super Cup: 2022

References

External links
 
 

1994 births
Living people
Ukrainian footballers
Ukraine youth international footballers
FC Dnipro players
FC Dnipro-2 Dnipropetrovsk players
FC Dunav Ruse players
First Professional Football League (Bulgaria) players
Ukrainian expatriate footballers
Expatriate footballers in Bulgaria
Ukrainian expatriate sportspeople in Bulgaria
Ukrainian expatriate sportspeople in Tajikistan
Expatriate footballers in Tajikistan
Association football defenders
Footballers from Dnipro
Ukrainian Second League players
FC Arsenal Kyiv players
FC Istiklol players
Tajikistan Higher League players